Serviços Executivos Aéreos de Angola (a.k.a. SEAA-Serviços Executivos Aéreos de Angola or simply SEAA) is an airline based in Lubango, Angola. The airline was established in 2009 and operates three Embraer ERJ family aircraft.

Fleet

See also
 List of airlines of Angola

References

Airlines of Angola
Airlines established in 2009